Pierre Lacotte (born 4 April 1932) is a French ballet dancer and choreographer who specialised in the reconstruction of lost choreographies of romantic ballets. His mother was an affirmed musician and he manifested very early his interest for dance. After an initial reluctance, his family surrendered to his stubbornness so that Lacotte could become a student of Gustave Ricaux, who taught at the Paris Opera.

In 1946 he was engaged in the Paris Opera Ballet and in 1953 became a principal dancer. Among his teachers at the Paris Opera Ballet School where Lubov Egorova, Carlotta Zambelli and the choreographer Serge Lifar, who chose Paulette Dynalix, Claude Bessy and Lacotte as the three interpretive dancers of Septuor, a single-act ballet presented in Paris on 25 January 1950.

In 1955 he left the Paris Opera to become a soloist dancer and was invited to perform all over the world. Subsequently, Lacotte founded a ballet company named Les Ballets de la Tour Eiffel. He choreographed Hippolyte et Aricie in 1960, and Il combattimento di Tancredi e Clorinda in 1961. From 1963 to 1968 he was appointed director of the Ballets des Jeunesses Musicales de France where he created many works including Hamlet (1964), La Voix (1965), and Intermede (1966).

Lacotte was a frequent dance partner of Yvette Chauvire, Lycette Darsonval and Christiane Vaussard.

In 1968, he married the ballerina Ghislaine Thesmar.

In 1971 Lacotte was appointed teacher at the Paris Opera and began to specialize in staging new versions of lost 19th century ballets, particlarly those from the romantic era:
 1972: La Sylphide (1832)
 1973: Coppélia (1870)
 1976: Pas de six from La Vivandière (1844)
 1976: Pas de deux of Le Papillon (1866)
 1978: La Fille du Danube (1836)
 1980: Nathalie, ou la Laitière Suisse (1821)
 1981: Marco Spada (1857)
 1982: Le Papillon (1866)
 1993: La Gitana (1838)
 1993: L'Ombre (1839)
 1995: Le Lac des fées (1840)
 2000: The Pharaoh's Daughter (1862)
 2001: Paquita (1846)
 2006: Ondine (1843)
He also re-created historical versions of Giselle (1978 and 1991), Swan Lake (1998) and The Nutcracker (2000) and some ballets of Michel Fokine: Polovtsian Dances (1986), The Firebird (1991), Le Spectre de la Rose (1997).

Between 1985 and 1988 he was associate director of the new Ballets de Monte Carlo, where he resumed creating original works (L'apprenti sorcier, Te Deum, Vingt-quatre heures de la vie d’une femme). From 1991 to 1999, he was artistic director of the Ballet National de Nancy et de Lorraine. He created the ballet Les Trois Mousquetaires in 2010, and his own versions of Coppélia in 2002 and La Fille du Danube in 2006.

Lacotte lives in Paris.

References

1932 births
Living people
French male ballet dancers
French choreographers
Prix Benois de la Danse winners
20th-century ballet dancers